= Geoffrey John Davies =

Australian media entrepreneur (born 1977)

- Born: April 4, 1977 (age 49); Brisbane, Australia
- Occupations: Media entrepreneur, editor
- Known for: Founder and CEO of The Violin Channel
- Spouse: Richard Jordan (m. 2020)

Geoffrey John Davies (born April 4, 1977) is an Australian-born media entrepreneur and founder of The Violin Channel, the classical music news and media platform. Davies has received awards and recognition from the Concert Artists Guild and Musical America for his pioneering work in digital media for classical music.

== Early life and education ==
Davies was born in Brisbane, Australia. He studied music performance at the Queensland Conservatorium and communications and business at the Queensland University of Technology.

== Career ==
=== The Violin Channel ===
In 2009, Davies founded The Violin Channel from his apartment in Brisbane, initially uploading content to YouTube and Facebook. The platform quickly attracted the attention of string players and classical music enthusiasts. In 2011, he relocated to New York City with limited financial resources and began expanding the channel's reach and establishing advertising partnerships. By the mid-2010s, The Violin Channel had become one of the most prominent online sources of classical music news, interviews, and video content, reaching over one million followers monthly.

=== Vanguard Concerts ===
During the COVID-19 pandemic, Davies co-produced the Vanguard Concerts in collaboration with the Alphadyne Foundation. The series presented digitally produced performances by leading string artists that gave the artists remuneration and ownership of the video recordings. The concerts reached several million viewers worldwide and were praised as an innovative response to the pandemic crisis amongst musicians.

== Board memberships and other roles ==
Davies serves on the recommendation board of the Avery Fisher Artist Program at Lincoln Center. In 2020 Davies was invited by the United Nations to speak at a conference organized by its Institute for Training and Research on the sustainable development of classical music. As part of its mentoring program for the 2022 competitors, the Carl Nielsen International Competition in Odense invited Davies to speak on the topic of social media for the performing artist. Davies was a presenter at the 2022 edition of the Classical:Next conference in Hannover, Germany on the topic of video streaming of concerts.

== Awards and recognition ==
The Concert Artists Guild honored Davies with the Musical Trailblazer Award of 2025 in recognition of his pioneering work in classical music media. Davies has been recognized twice by Musical America: once in 2015 as one of classical music's most influential young professionals ("MA 30: The Influencers") and again in 2022, naming him amongst its "Top 30 Professionals of the Year".

== Personal life ==
Davies married Richard Jordan, an architectural painter and designer, in 2020. They live in New York City's West Village with their dog, Elgar.
